The members of the fifteenth National Assembly of South Korea were elected on 11 April 1996. The Assembly sat from 30 May 1996 until 29 May 2000.

Members

References

015
National Assembly members 015